Ray Bobrownicki (born 3 March 1984) is an athlete who competed for Scotland in the High Jump at the 2014 Commonwealth Games in Glasgow, placing ninth in the final with a performance of 2.21 metres.   His personal best of 2.28 metres, achieved in 2014, ranks him twelfth on the all-time British list.

See also
Athletics at the 2014 Commonwealth Games – Men's high jump
2014 Commonwealth rankings in athletics

References

External links

Ray Bobrownicki profile at thepowerof10.info

Living people
1984 births
Scottish male high jumpers
Commonwealth Games competitors for Scotland
Athletes (track and field) at the 2014 Commonwealth Games